The Windsor Spitfires were a Canadian junior ice hockey team in the Ontario Hockey Association (OHA) from 1946 to 1953. The team was based in Windsor, Ontario. The current Windsor Spitfires, founded in 1971, are the namesake of these Spitfires. The Spitfires played home games at the Windsor Arena, built in 1924.

History
The Windsor Spitfires were founded in 1946 as part of a four-year plan enacted by Lloyd Pollock, the secretary-treasurer of the Windsor City Hockey League. He established a junior league for the 1942–43 season in Windsor, competing at the Junior B-level in the Ontario Hockey Association (OHA). The ultimate goal of Junior A-level team was realized in 1946, for the 1946–47 OHA season. Pollock and business partner Jack Dent obtained franchise rights from the OHA for C$500, and purchased uniform for another $100. The team lost its first game 15–0 to the Toronto St. Michael's Majors, but attracted a crowd of 4,062 spectators at the Windsor Arena. Pollock served as the team's general manager, and worked with the Detroit Red Wings to develop players. Pollock convinced the Detroit Red Wings to relocate prospect players from the Galt Red Wings to Windsor in 1947.

The Spitfires were coached by Jimmy Skinner, and reached the J. Ross Robertson Cup final during the 1947–48 OHA season. The team produced several future star players for the Red Wings, including Glenn Hall, Marcel Pronovost, Earl Reibel, Johnny Wilson, and Glen Skov.

In 1953, the Spitfires were sold to Hamilton to create the Hamilton Tiger Cubs.  The Spitfires were replaced by an OHA Senior A Hockey League team called the Windsor Bulldogs.  The Bulldogs won the OHA Senior A championship in 1962 and 1963 as well as the Allan Cup in 1963.  They turned professional for one season after winning the Allan Cup, then folded.

In 1971, the Windsor Spitfires were reformed in the Southern Ontario Junior A Hockey League.  In 1975, they were accepted into the OHA.

Championships
J. Ross Robertson Cup appearances
 1947–48 finalists versus the Barrie Flyers
 1949–50 finalists versus the Guelph Biltmore Mad Hatters

Players
Award winners
 1948–49 – Bert Giesebrecht Eddie Powers Memorial Trophy OHA Scoring Champion
 1949–50 – Earl Reibel Eddie Powers Memorial Trophy OHA Scoring Champion
 1950–51 – Glenn Hall Red Tilson Trophy OHA Most Outstanding Player

NHL alumni

Season-by-season results

See also
List of ice hockey teams in Ontario

References

External links
 Windsor Arena

Defunct Ontario Hockey League teams
Sport in Windsor, Ontario
1946 establishments in Ontario
1953 disestablishments in Ontario
Ice hockey clubs established in 1946
Ice hockey clubs disestablished in 1953